The Rawalpindi women's cricket team is the women's representative cricket team for Rawalpindi. They competed in the National Women's Cricket Championship between 2004–05 and 2017.

History
Rawalpindi joined the National Women's Cricket Championship for its inaugural season in 2004–05, losing to eventual winners Karachi in the initial knock-out stage. The side went on to compete in every edition of the National Women's Cricket Championship until it ended in 2017, but never made it out of the initial group stage. Their best performance came in the 2011–12 season, when they won two matches of their four matches in Zone B.

Players

Notable players
Players who played for Rawalpindi and played internationally are listed below, in order of first international appearance (given in brackets):

 Kiran Ahtazaz (1997)
 Naila Nazir (2009)
 Aliya Riaz (2014)

Seasons

National Women's Cricket Championship

See also
 Rawalpindi cricket team

References

Women's cricket teams in Pakistan
Cricket in Rawalpindi